Drive, She Said was an American rock band consisting of Al Fritsch and Mark Mangold. The band formed in 1986. They were signed by CBS Records in 1988 and their debut self-titled album, released in 1989, included guest appearances by Aldo Nova, Fiona Flanagan, and Bob Kulick.

Some songs by Drive, She Said, appeared in the 2003 American short film Advantage Hart.

On October 10, 2017, Fritsch died.

Personnel
 Al Fritsch – vocals, guitar, bass guitar, keyboards
 Mark Mangold – keyboards, backing vocals, drums

Discography

Studio albums
 Drive, She Said (1989)
 Drivin' Wheel (1991)
 Excelerator (1993)
 Real Life (2003)
 Pedal to the Metal (2016)

Compilation albums
 Road to Paradise (1998)
 Dreams Will Come - The Best of & More (2010)

Singles
 "If This Is Love" (1989)
 "Think of Love" (1991)
 "When You Love Someone" (1991)

References

External links 
 Drive, She Said at Discogs.com

American rock music groups